Anamika Choudhari is an Indian singer. She was the winner in Zee TV's children's singing competition Sa Re Ga Ma Pa L'il Champs International. Later, she participated in Chota Packet Bada Dhamaka, where she secured fourth place. She then participated in Hero Honda SaReGaMaPa Mega Challenge representing Assam along with Biswajit Ray and Joy Chakraborty.

References

External links 
 New champ on the block
 Anamika is the Sa Re Ga Ma Pa li'l champs winner

Assamese playback singers
Indian pop singers
Indian women playback singers
Indian women pop singers
Living people
People from Jorhat district
Singers from Assam
Women musicians from Assam
21st-century Indian women singers
21st-century Indian singers
Year of birth missing (living people)